'''Jagannath University (JnU) ( Jagannātha biśbabidyālaẏa, University Acrostic : জবি or JnU) is a state-funded public university at 9–10, Chittaranjan Avenue in Sadarghat, Dhaka, the capital of Bangladesh. Even though it is one of the most famous and academically one of the best universities in Bangladesh, JnU is the only non-residential University in this country  Jagannath University opens its first residential hall, only for females Jagannath University is in the southern part of Dhaka city near the River Buriganga and a new super modern campus of approximately 200 acres is being built at Keraniganj. Total campus area is more than 210 acres with three campus and a girls residence hall.

History
The university has a history that started in 1858 when Dhaka Brahma School was founded by Dinanath Sen, Prabhaticharan Roy, Anathbandhu Mallik and Brajasundar Kaitra.

In 1884, it was raised to a second grade college. Law was one of the first courses introduced. A common management committee administered the school and college until 1887, when the school section was separated to form the independent Kishore Jubilee School, now known as K. L. Jubilee School. The administration of the college was transferred to a board of trustees in 1907. In the following year, it became a first grade college.

The college started with 48 students. In five years, the roll rose to 396. In 1910, Raja Manmath Roy Chowdhury, the Zamindar of Santosh, Tangail, affiliated the Pramath-Manmath College of Tangail with Jagannath College. With the establishment of the University of Dhaka in 1921, it stopped admission to degree courses and was renamed Jagannath Intermediate College. This status was changed after 28 years in 1949, when it reopened degree classes. The college was taken over by the government in 1968.

Jagannath College opened honours and masters programmes in 1975. That year the government once again took over and upgraded it into a postgraduate college. In 1982, the college closed its programmes at the intermediate level. It introduced evening shifts in 1992.

It was transformed into Jagannath University in 2005 by passage in the national parliament of the Jagannath University Act-2005.

Ranking

International ranking
In 2022, The ranking position of Jagannath University is 3399.
While the top position from Bangladesh is 1468. (All information is updated in July 2022 edition)

Academics
Jagannath University has 36 departments under seven faculties and two Institutes. Every department follows the semester system.  there are 960 teachers and 19,088 students in Honors, Masters, M.Phil. and PhD programmes.

Faculties

There are six faculties, 36 departments, and two institutes at Jagannath University.

Faculty of Life and Earth Sciences
Department of Biochemistry and Molecular Biology
Department of Microbiology
 Department of Pharmacy
 Department of Zoology
 Department of Botany
 Department of Psychology
 Department of Geography and Environment
 Department of Genetic Engineering and Biotechnology

Faculty of Science
 Department of Computer Science and Engineering (CSE)
 Department of Mathematics 
 Department of Chemistry 
 Department of Physics 
 Department of Statistics

Faculty of Business Studies
 Department of Finance
Department of Management studies 
 Department of Marketing
 Department of Accounting and information systems

Faculty of Arts
 Department of Bengali
 Department of English
 Department of History
 Department of Philosophy
 Department of Islamic History and Culture
 Department of Islamic Studies 
Institute of Education Research
Institute of Modern Languages

Faculty of Law

 Department of Law
 Department of Land Management and Law

Faculty of Social Science
 Department of Sociology
 Department of Anthropology
 Department of Economics
 Department of Political Science
 Department of Public Administration
 Department of Social Work
 Department of Mass Communication and Journalism
 Department of Film and Television

Faculty of Fine Arts
 Department of Fine Arts 
 Department of Drama and Dramatics
 Department of MusicOrganizations in the University Campus Jagannath University Film Society - JNUFS
 Jagannath University Journalism Association - JNUJA

List of vice chancellors

Notable alumni

The teachers and students of the then college took an active part in the Language Movement of the early 1950s, the mass movements of the 1960s and the Bangladesh War of Independence in 1971.

 Commander BDF Sector 11 – M. Hamidullah Khan Bir Protik – Bangladesh War of Independence 1971.
 Rafiq Uddin Ahmed- protester killed during the Bengali Language Movement that took place in East Pakistan (currently Bangladesh) in 1952. He is considered a martyr in Bangladesh.
 Sergeant Zahurul Haq - was a Pakistan Air Force sergeant. He was one of the 35 persons accused in the Agartala Conspiracy Case in 1969. He received the Independence Day Award from the Government of Bangladesh in 2018. Sergeant Zahurul Haq Hall of the University of Dhaka is named after him. BAF Zahurul Haq base, a Bangladesh Air Force''' base is named after him.
 Bhanu Bandopadhyay- an Indian actor, known for his work in Bengali cinema. He acted in over 300 movies, in numerous plays, and frequently performed on the radio.
 Md. Saifur Rahman Freedom fighter, member of parliament
 Mofazzal Hossain Chowdhury – Freedom Fighter of Crack Platoon, Bangladeshi Minister, Member of Parliament, Bangladesh Awami League leader
 Abdul Hamid – sports organizer and sports journalist
 Bhabatosh Dutta – economist
 Premendra Mitra – writer and poet
 Anisuzzaman – educationist, researcher
 Kaliprasanna Vidyaratna – Sanskrit scholar, author
 Haider Hussain – singer
 ATM Shamsuzzaman - actor
 Brojen Das – swimmer, the first Indian to swim the English channel
 Imdadul Haq Milan – novelist and editor
 Mohammed Nasim – Bangladeshi minister
Ajit Dutta - Bengali writer & poet
Md. Waliar Rahman - Bangladeshi civil servant and career diplomat
Ajit Krishna Basu - Bengali writer & magician
 Mahadi-Ul-Morshed, Researcher, Entrepreneur, and Organizer. He received the first M.Phil. degree jointly as a direct student of the university.

References

External links
 Official website
 Ministry of Education
 University Grants Commission Bangladesh

 
Universities and colleges in Dhaka
Public universities of Bangladesh
Educational institutions established in 1858
1858 establishments in British India